Keflavíkurvöllur is a multi-use stadium in Keflavík, Iceland.  It is currently used mostly for football matches.  Keflavík Football Club plays there. The stadium holds 4,000.  The stadium is currently called Nettó-völlur after one of the club's sponsor, Nettó. 

In October 2009 the grass had to be changed because of its poor condition; if it rained, the grass would change into mud in only a short time.

References

Football venues in Iceland
Keflavík
Knattspyrnudeild Keflavík